The Journal of Applied Economics is a peer-reviewed open-access academic journal  established in 1998 that covers applied issues in micro- and macroeconomics, including industrial organization, international economics, labor economics, finance, money and banking, growth, public finance, political economy, law and economics, and environmental economics.

History
The journal was established in 1998 by the Universidad del CEMA; the online version was published by Elsevier on their behalf from 2009 to 2017. In 2018 the journal was bought by Routledge who converted it to a fully open-access journal.

Editors
The founding editor-in-chief was Carlos Alfredo Rodríguez, the current editors are Germán Coloma, Mariana Conte Grand, and Jorge M. Streb (Universidad del CEMA).

Abstracting and indexing
The journal is abstracted and indexed in:
ABI/INFORM
EBSCO databases
EconLit
International Bibliography of the Social Sciences
Scopus (2006-2017)
Social Sciences Citation Index
According to the Journal Citation Reports, the journal has a 2017 impact factor of 0.375.

References

External links 

Economics journals
Routledge academic journals
Publications established in 1998
English-language journals
Open access journals
Continuous journals